Ned Bernard Stonehouse (March 19, 1902 - November 18, 1962) was a renowned New Testament scholar. He joined J. Gresham Machen in the founding of Westminster Theological Seminary in 1929, where he worked for over thirty years. Stonehouse served as one of the 34 constituting members of the Orthodox Presbyterian Church in 1936. He received the A.B. from Calvin College (1924), the Th.B. and Th.M. from Princeton Theological Seminary (1927), and the Ph.D. from the Free University of Amsterdam (1929).

Books
Among his books are the following:

The Witness of Matthew and Mark to Christ (1941)
The Witness of Luke to Christ (1951)
Origins of the Synoptic Gospels (1963)
J. Gresham Machen, A Biographical Memoir (1954)
Paul Before the Areopagus (1957)
Editor (with Paul Woolley), The Infallible Word (1946)
General editor, New International Commentary on the New Testament (1946-1962)

References

1902 births
1962 deaths
20th-century American theologians
American Calvinist and Reformed theologians
Princeton Theological Seminary alumni
Westminster Theological Seminary faculty
20th-century Calvinist and Reformed theologians
Orthodox Presbyterian Church members
Orthodox Presbyterian Church ministers
20th-century American clergy